Gastom Kouadio is an Ivorian sprinter. He competed in the men's 4 × 100 metres relay at the 1976 Summer Olympics.

References

Year of birth missing (living people)
Living people
Athletes (track and field) at the 1976 Summer Olympics
Ivorian male sprinters
Olympic athletes of Ivory Coast
Place of birth missing (living people)